Japan has three levels of governments: national, prefectural, and municipal. The nation is divided into 47 prefectures. Each prefecture consists of numerous municipalities, with 1,719 in total (January 2014 figures) . There are four types of municipalities in Japan: cities, towns, villages and special wards (the ku of Tokyo). Some designated cities also have further administrative subdivisions, also known as wards. But, unlike the Special wards of Tokyo, these wards are not municipalities.

Status 
The status of a municipality, if it is a village, town or city, is decided by the prefectural government. Generally, a village or town can be promoted to a city when its population increases above fifty thousand, and a city can (but need not) be demoted to a town or village when its population decreases below fifty thousand. The least-populated city, Utashinai, Hokkaidō, has a population of merely four thousand, while a town in the same prefecture, Otofuke, Hokkaidō, has nearly forty thousand residents, and the country's largest village Yomitan, Okinawa has a population of 40,517.

The capital city, Tokyo, no longer has city status. Tokyo Prefecture now encompasses 23 special wards, each a city unto itself, as well as many other cities, towns and even villages on the Japanese mainland and outlying islands. Each of the 23 special wards of Tokyo is legally equivalent to a city, though sometimes the 23 special wards as a whole are regarded as one city. For information on the former city of Tokyo, see Tokyo City; for information about present-day Tokyo Prefecture, see Tokyo.

Examples 
See List of cities in Japan for a complete list of cities. See also: Core cities of Japan

The following are examples of the 20 designated cities:
Fukuoka, the most populous city in the Kyūshū region
Hiroshima, the busy manufacturing city in the Chūgoku region of Honshū
Kobe, a major port on the Inland Sea, located in the center of Honshū near Osaka
Kitakyūshū, a city of just over one million inhabitants in Kyūshū
Kyoto, former capital, historic center and thriving modern city
Nagasaki, a port on the island of Kyūshū
Nagoya, center of a major automobile-manufacturing region on the eastern seaboard of Honshū
Osaka, a vast manufacturing city on the Inland Sea coast of Honshū
Sapporo, the largest city in Hokkaidō
Sendai, the principal center of northeast Honshū (also known as the Tōhoku region)
Yokohama, a port city just south of Tokyo

Non-municipality
The same kanji which designates a town (町) is also sometimes used for addresses of sections of an urban area. In rare cases, a municipal village might even contain a section with the same type of designation.  Although the kanji is the same, neither of these individual sections are municipalities unto themselves.  Sometimes, the section name is a remnant from gappei, a system where several adjacent communities merge to form a larger municipality, where the old town names are kept for a section of the new city, even though the resulting new city may have a completely different name.
 Subprefectures are branch offices of the prefectures and not municipalities by themselves.
 Districts are not current municipalities but names of groups of towns and villages.
 Provinces are not current municipalities but (almost obsolete) names of geographical regions similar to prefectures.

See also
 Administrative division
 Urban area
 Local Autonomy Law
 23 special wards of Tokyo
 Japanese addressing system
 Merger and dissolution of municipalities of Japan
 List of mergers and dissolutions of municipalities in Japan

External links
 Local Government in Japan Council of Local Authorities for International Relations 2010 (Retrieved on February 4, 2013)
 "Large City System of Japan"; graphic shows Japanese city types at p. 1 [PDF 7 of 40]

Subdivisions of Japan
Japan 3
Municipalities, Japan